Sir David Richard Llewellyn, 1st Baronet (9 March 1879 – 15 December 1940) was a Welsh industrialist and financier.

He was born in Aberdare, South Wales, the son of Alderman Rees Llewellyn, JP and educated at Llandovery College and Cardiff University. Starting with one small colliery in 1905 his expertise with  electrically driven cutters that could mine thin seams enabled him to systematically  acquire a range of businesses across the south Wales coalfields. He was created a baronet in 1922; and in 1930 he was elected chairman  of Welsh Associated Collieries Ltd.

References

1879 births
1940 deaths
People from Aberdare
People educated at Llandovery College
Alumni of Cardiff University
20th-century Welsh businesspeople
Baronets in the Baronetage of the United Kingdom